Physetica prionistis is a moth of the family Noctuidae. It was described by Edward Meyrick in 1887. It is endemic to New Zealand and is widespread throughout the North, South and Chatham Islands. This species can be found in open clearings of shrubland and forest at altitudes from sea level up to the alpine zone. Adults are on the wing throughout the year and are attracted to sugar traps and occasionally to light. The life history of this species is unknown as are the larval host species.

Taxonomy 
This species was first described by Edward Meyrick in 1887 and named Mamestra prionistis. In 1898 George Hudson discussed this species under the name Melanchra prionistis. In 1928 Hudson again discussed the species under the same name. In 1988 J. S. Dugdale placed this species in the genus Graphania. In 2017 Robert Hoare undertook a review of New Zealand Noctuinae and placed this species in the genus Physetica. The lectotype specimen was collected by Richard William Fereday in Rakaia and held at the Natural History Museum, London.

Description

Meyrick described the species as follows:
The adult male of this species has a wingspan of between 37 and 45 mm and the female of between 39 and 43 mm.  This species is distinctive as it has a white central stripe down its thorax and the darker stripe of colour along the back part of the forewing.

Distribution 
This species is endemic to New Zealand and is widespread throughout the North, South and Chatham Islands. This species is regarded as being rare in most locations however it has been found to be common at Mount Te Aroha.

Habitat 
This species is found in open clearings of shrubland and forest at altitudes from sea level up to the alpine zone (at least 1850 m).

Behaviour
This species is on the wing throughout the year and are attracted to sugar traps and occasionally to light. This species can sometimes be found during the day resting on trees, where it is camouflaged by its colouring.

Life history and host species 
The life history of this species is unknown as are the larval host species. The larvae of this species have yet to be found.

References

Moths described in 1887
Hadeninae
Moths of New Zealand
Endemic fauna of New Zealand
Taxa named by Edward Meyrick
Endemic moths of New Zealand